Ngô Nhật Khánh (died 979), formally Prince An (安王), was a Vietnamese warlord during the Period of the 12 Warlords.

Khánh was a grandson of Ngô Quyền. He occupied Đường Lâm (mordern Sơn Tây, Hanoi), and titled himself Ngô Lãm Công (吳覽公).

Khánh was defeated by Đinh Bộ Lĩnh in 968. Đinh Bộ Lĩnh married his mother. Khánh also married a daughter of Đinh Bộ Lĩnh, and one of his sisters married Đinh Liễn. But Khánh hated Đinh Bộ Lĩnh intensely. He subsequently took his wife and children and hastened to Champa. Arriving at a seaport on the southern border, he drew a dagger from his waist and slashed his wife’s face, scolding her by saying:

"Your father coerced and ravished my mother and younger sister; how can I, just because of you, forget your father’s cruelty? You go back; I will go a different way to look for those who can help me.” He was exiled in Champa. 

In October 979, Đinh Bộ Lĩnh and Đinh Liễn were killed by a eunuch named Đỗ Thích while they were sleeping in the palace courtyard, and the country fell into chaos. After hearing the news, Khánh encouraged Paramesvaravarman I, the king of Champa, to invade Đại Việt. His hope was dashed when a storm destroyed much of the Champa fleet. He fell overboard and drowned.

References

Source
 

979 deaths
Year of birth unknown
Ngô dynasty
People from Hanoi
Anarchy of the 12 Warlords
Đinh dynasty officials
Đinh dynasty generals
10th-century Vietnamese people